Boston's diverse neighborhoods serve as a political and cultural organizing mechanism. The City of Boston's Office of Neighborhood Services has designated 23 Neighborhoods in the city:

 Allston
 Back Bay
 Bay Village
 Beacon Hill
 Brighton
 Charlestown
 Chinatown–Leather District
 Dorchester (divided for planning purposes into Mid-Dorchester and Dorchester)
 Downtown
 East Boston
 Fenway-Kenmore (includes Longwood)
 Hyde Park
 Jamaica Plain
 Mattapan
 Mission Hill
 North End
 Roslindale
 Roxbury
 South Boston
 South End
 West End
 West Roxbury
 Wharf District

The islands in Boston Harbor are administered as part of the Boston Harbor Islands National Recreation Area.

The Boston Redevelopment Authority, the City Parking Clerk, and the City's Department of Neighborhood Development have also designated their own neighborhoods. Unofficially, Boston has many overlapping neighborhoods of various sizes. Neighborhood associations have formed around smaller communities or commercial districts (often with "Square" in the name) that have a well-defined center but poorly identified extremities.

History of Boston's neighborhoods

As the city of Boston has grown and evolved, its neighborhoods have changed as well. The names of the West End, North End and South End refer to their positions on the Shawmut Peninsula, the original extent of Boston. Due to the annexation of surrounding communities, those neighborhoods are no longer at those geographic extremities. The Back Bay and Bay Village neighborhoods were formerly part of an actual bay, becoming the neighborhoods they are today after landfill projects expanded the size of the city. Brighton (including Allston), Charlestown, Dorchester (including South Boston, Mid Dorchester, Mattapan and Hyde Park), Roxbury (including West Roxbury, Roslindale and Jamaica Plain), have all at some point been municipalities independent from downtown Boston, providing a source of well-defined boundaries for the largest areas.

Geographic overview
Downtown Boston includes Downtown Crossing, the Financial District and Government Center.

Surrounding downtown are the neighborhoods of Chinatown/Leather District, South End, North End, West End, Bay Village, Beacon Hill and Back Bay. Chinatown/Leather District is the historical garment district and today has thriving Chinese and other Asian populations. The South End is the center of the city's LGBT population and also populated by artists and young professionals as well as a vibrant African American community. The North End retains an Italian flavor with its many Italian restaurants, though many of its Italian families have moved out, while young professionals have moved in.  The Back Bay is west of the Public Garden, and Beacon Hill is the site of the Massachusetts State House. The Back Bay and Beacon Hill are also home to national and local politicians, famous authors and top business leaders and professionals. Bay Village is one of the smallest neighborhoods in Boston and mostly contains Greek Revival-style row houses.

North and east of downtown are the neighborhoods of East Boston and Charlestown. East Boston has a majority of Hispanics, Brazilians, and young professionals, with a remnant of older Italians, and is the site of Logan International Airport. On the north bank of the Charles River is Charlestown; once a predominantly Irish enclave and site of the Bunker Hill Monument, it is now a home for young professionals.

West of downtown are the neighborhoods of Fenway Kenmore, Allston, Brighton, Longwood and Mission Hill. Fenway Kenmore borders the campus of Boston University and houses many college students and young professionals and is the location of Fenway Park. Allston and Brighton are populated heavily by students from nearby universities, as well as recent graduates. Mission Hill is an ethnically diverse neighborhood, adjacent to the Longwood area, which is full of world-class medical institutions. 

South of downtown are the neighborhoods of Roxbury, Jamaica Plain, Dorchester, Mid Dorchester and South Boston. Dorchester, including Mid Dorchester, is Boston's largest neighborhood and predominantly a working class community considered to be Boston's most diverse. Roxbury is populated largely by African Americans, Caribbean Americans and Latinos and is historically the center of Boston's black community. Jamaica Plain is a community of white professionals and Latinos, and includes the larger side of the Arnold Arboretum. South Boston is a predominantly Irish-American neighborhood, which hosts the city's annual St. Patrick's Day parade.

South of Roxbury, Jamaica Plain and Dorchester are the neighborhoods of Mattapan, Roslindale, Hyde Park and West Roxbury. Roslindale is known for its small business district and includes the smaller side of the Arnold Arboretum. Roslindale has also recently become a majority-minority neighborhood. Mattapan remains the neighborhood with Boston's highest concentrations of African Americans. Hyde Park and West Roxbury have a distinct suburban feel, while still being a part of the city of Boston. Both neighborhoods have large areas of wooded parks and recreation land. Hyde Park is populated largely by African Americans and Caribbean Americans, whereas West Roxbury is predominantly white, but with rapidly growing African American, Middle Eastern and Latino populations.

List of places and squares within neighborhood areas
The 23 official neighborhoods in Boston are made up of approximately 84 sub-districts, squares and neighborhoods within each official neighborhood. The Boston Redevelopment Authority defines 16 planning districts (plus the Boston Harbor Islands) and 64 Neighborhood Statistical Areas (with four areas further subdivided). These correspond roughly with the neighborhoods and sub-neighborhoods of Boston. Unofficially, Boston is made up of approximately 105 neighborhoods.
 Allston and Brighton
 Allston Village
 Brighton Center
 Cleveland Circle
 Harvard Stadium/Charlesview
 Union Square
 Oak Square
 Faneuil Square
 Brighton Mills
 Lower Allston
 North Brighton
 Packard's Corner
 Soldier's Field
 Back Bay
 Copley Square/Boston Public Library
 Commonwealth Avenue Mall
 Newbury Street

 Bay Village (also known as South Cove)
 Beacon Hill
 Louisburg Square
 Massachusetts State House
 Charlestown
 Bunker Hill
 The Neck
 The Navy Yard
 Hayes Square
 City Square
 Thompson Square
 Sullivan Square
 Chestnut Hill
 Chinatown and the Leather District
 Dorchester
 Adams Corner/Adams Village
 Ashmont (including Ashmont Hill, Ashmont-Adams and Peabody Square)
 Columbia Point/Harbor Point
 South Bay
 Cedar Grove
 Fields Corner
 Franklin Field
 Grove Hall
 Lower Mills
 Jones Hill
 Meeting House Hill
 Neponset
 Polish Triangle (extends into South Boston)
 Popes Hill
 Port Norfolk
 Savin Hill
 Uphams Corner
 Downtown Boston and the Financial District
 Bulfinch Triangle
 Combat Zone (defunct)
 Downtown Crossing/Ladder District
 Fort Hill Square
 Government Center
 Haymarket Square (Boston)
 Post Office Square
 South Station
 Boston Theater District
 Waterfront 
 East Boston
 Eagle Hill
 Jeffries Point
 Orient Heights
 Central Square
 Day Square
 Maverick Square
Boston Logan International Airport
Ted Williams Tunnel
Callahan Tunnel
Sumner Tunnel
Suffolk Downs
 Fenway/Kenmore
 Audubon Circle
 Back Bay Fens
 Kenmore Square
 Boston University (extends into Allston)
 Longwood Medical Area (extends into Mission Hill)
 Lansdowne Street/Fenway Park
 Hyde Park
 Readville
 Fairmount Hill
 Sunnyside

 Jamaica Plain
 Hyde Square
 Forest Hills/Woodbourne
 Moss Hill
 Mattapan
 Wellington Hill
 Mattapan Square
 Mid Dorchester
 Bowdoin-Geneva
 Codman Square
 Four Corners
 Mission Hill and Longwood
 Brigham Circle
 Back of the Hill
 Parker Hill
 North End
 Ann Street (North Street)
 Hanover Street

 Roslindale
 Roslindale Square
 Roxbury
 Egleston Square
 Fort Hill
 Franklin Park (extends into Jamaica Plain and Dorchester)
 Nubian Square (formerly Dudley Square)
 Roxbury Crossing
 South Boston
 Andrew Square (extends into Dorchester)
 D Street
 Dorchester Heights / Telegraph Hill
 Fort Point
 South Boston Waterfront/Seaport District
 City Point
 South End
 South of Washington (SoWa)
 West End
 Charles Street
 North Station/TD Garden
 Massachusetts General Hospital
 West Roxbury
Parkway (extends into Roslindale)

References

External links

Lists of neighborhoods
 Office of Neighborhood Services
 Boston Redevelopment Authority
 
Neighborhood guides
 Boston Neighborhoods website
 Wikivoyage Boston guide
 Things to Do in Boston's Neighborhoods - Photos & Recommendations

 
Boston